Angus McLaren (born 1942) is professor emeritus of history at the University of Victoria, British Columbia, and a leading historian of sexuality.

Selected publications
 A History of Contraception: From Antiquity to Present Day
 Sexual Blackmail: A Modern History
 A Prescription for Murder: The Victorian Serial Killings of Dr. Thomas Neill Cream. University of Chicago Press, Chicago, 1993.
 The Trials of Masculinity: Studies in the Policing of Sexual Boundaries, 1870-1930. University of Chicago Press, Chicago, 1997.
 Twentieth-Century Sexuality: A History
 Impotence: A Cultural History. University of Chicago Press, Chicago, 2007. 
 Reproduction by Design: Sex, Robots, Trees, and Test-Tube Babies in Interwar Britain. University of Chicago Press, Chicago, 2012.

References 

Academic staff of the University of Victoria
Historians of sexuality
1942 births
Living people